Hassan Kachloul (born 19 February 1973) is a Moroccan former professional footballer who played as a midfielder. He represented the Morocco national team and was a squad member at the 1994 FIFA World Cup.

Career
Born in Agadir, Morocco, Kachloul was raised in Belleville in France and spent his early career in French football, with Nîmes Olympique, before signing for FC Metz, who loaned him to USL Dunkerque and AS Saint-Étienne respectively.

After being released by his parent club FC Metz at his own request, and not being part of the Morocco squad for the World Cup of 1998, he spent a spell searching for a new club before moving to England, joining top flight Southampton in October 1998. He remained at The Dell until June 2001 when he joined Aston Villa after his contract expired. He had originally made a verbal agreement to join Ipswich Town, and was celebrated as a crucial signing, but changed his mind at the last minute to head to Villa Park.

Kachloul was signed by John Gregory and played almost all his games for the club under him. After Gregory resigned in January 2002, he was frozen out by, firstly, Graham Taylor, and later David O'Leary.

The midfielder left Aston Villa in July 2004, after failing to appear for the club in the 2003–04 season. He had spent five months on loan at fellow Premier League side Wolves during the campaign, but had only managed four games, after suffering injury and illness.

After a spell as a free agent, he joined Livingston, where he helped the club avoid relegation. His time at Livingston was somewhat overshadowed due to the suspicious circumstances of his transfer. As he had joined as a free agent, and was signed outside the transfer window, he played under 'amateur' status. However, this was found to be unsound as he was discovered to be receiving an income from Livingston. The SPL ruled that as the player could have been signed as a professional and there had been no need to sign him as an amateur on 31 March 2005. Livingston argued that they had gained no competitive advantage from this situation, and therefore a points deduction was not imposed. The club was fined £15,000.

After leaving Livingston, he had a trial at Derby County in late 2005, but was not signed and has since retired. He currently works as a property developer.

Career statistics

Honours
Aston Villa
UEFA Intertoto Cup: 2001

References

External links
Player's website at www.icons.com 

1973 births
Living people
People from Agadir
Moroccan footballers
Association football midfielders
Morocco international footballers
2000 African Cup of Nations players
1994 FIFA World Cup players
Ligue 1 players
Premier League players
Scottish Premier League players
Nîmes Olympique players
FC Metz players
USL Dunkerque players
Southampton F.C. players
Aston Villa F.C. players
Wolverhampton Wanderers F.C. players
Livingston F.C. players
AS Saint-Étienne players
Moroccan expatriate footballers
Moroccan expatriate sportspeople in France
Expatriate footballers in France
Moroccan expatriate sportspeople in England
Expatriate footballers in England
Moroccan expatriate sportspeople in Scotland
Expatriate footballers in Scotland